State Route 154 (SR 154) is a  state highway in the area around Atlanta in the U.S. state of Georgia. It begins in Sharpsburg and ends just to the east of Avondale Estates. The road also runs through portions of Atlanta.

Route description

Southwest of Atlanta
SR 154 begins at an intersection with SR 54 in Sharpsburg, in Coweta County. It heads northwest and intersects with SR 34 just west of Peachtree City and continues northwest where it has an interchange with Interstate 85 (I-85) at exit 51. In Palmetto, US 29/SR 14 (Roosevelt Highway) split to the northeast, while SR 154 heads north, concurrent with US 29 Alternate/SR 14 Alternate through town, until US 29 Alternate/SR 14 Alternate depart to the east-northeast, along South Fulton Parkway. The route continues to the north and intersects SR 70 (Cochran Mill Road). The two roads begin a concurrency to the northwest. They meet SR 92. The three highways cross the Chattahoochee River, which marks the Coweta–Fulton county line. Then, they intersect SR 166 (Duncan Memorial Highway), which joins the concurrency. The four routes head to the northeast concurrently, until SR 92 (Fairburn Road) splits to the northwest and the other three highways heads east to cross over the Chattahoochee River again, and cross back into Fulton County. About  later, SR 70 (Fulton Industrial Boulevard SW) departs to the northeast, while SR 154/SR 166 continue to the east. Just a little bit later, they cross SR 6 (Camp Creek Parkway), entering the Sandtown community on its way to the Ben Hill neighborhood of Atlanta, northeast of which they have an interchange with I-285 (The Perimeter/Atlanta Bypass).

Inside the Perimeter

SR 154/SR 166 head east as the Arthur B. Langford Jr. Parkway, a limited-access freeway that was originally named the Lakewood Freeway and was planned as I-420. It runs along the East Point–Atlanta city line, with a brief cross into East Point proper, before running along the city line again. The Parkway passes Fort McPherson Army base. The concurrent routes meets US 29/SR 14/SR 139 (Main Street/Lee Street SW). SR 154 heads north-northeast into Atlanta proper, concurrent with these three highways. Just before reaching I-20, SR 139 departs to the west (on Ralph David Abernathy Boulevard), while US 29/SR 14/SR 154 continue to the north-northeast. They cross under, but don't have an interchange with, I-20. SR 14/SR 154 heads northeast and cross over, but don't intersect, US 19/US 41/SR 3. At the intersection with Spring Street SW, SR 14 abruptly ends, and SR 154 continues eastward. A short distance later, it crosses over, but doesn't have an interchange with, I-75/I-85. SR 154 parallels I-20 along Memorial Drive SE, intersecting US 23/SR 42 (Moreland Avenue SE), which forms the Fulton–DeKalb county line. Then, it meets SR 155 (Candler Road SE). SR 154 heads northeast to an intersection with US 278/SR 12 (Covington Highway). It continues to the northeast for about  until it meets its eastern terminus, an intersection with SR 10 (Mountain Drive/Memorial Drive).

National Highway System
The only parts of SR 154 that are part of the National Highway System, a system of roadways important to the nation's economy, defense, and mobility, are those parts concurrent with US 29/SR 14 southwest of Palmetto; US 29 Alternate/SR 14 Alternate in, and northeast of, Palmetto; and the Langford Parkway in East Point and Atlanta.

Major intersections

Special routes

State Route 154 Connector

State Route 154 Connector (SR 154 Conn.) is a  connecting route of SR 154 that exists entirely within the southeastern part of Atlanta, in Fulton County.

It begins just east of Grant Park, which contains the Atlanta Cyclorama & Civil War Museum, in Glenwood Park, at an intersection with Glenwood Avenue SE. The highway heads due north to an interchange with Interstate 20 (I-20). It continues its due north orientation until it meets its northern terminus, an intersection with the SR 154 mainline (Memorial Drive SE), in Reynoldstown.

SR 154 Conn. is not part of the National Highway System, a system of roadways important to the nation's economy, defense, and mobility.

State Route 154 Spur

State Route 154 Spur (SR 154 Spur) exists entirely within the central part of DeKalb County, southeast of Avondale Estates.

It begins at an intersection with the SR 154 mainline (Memorial Drive SE) and runs in a generally eastern route to meet its eastern terminus, an intersection with US 278/SR 12 (Covington Highway).

SR 154 Spur is not part of the National Highway System, a system of roadways important to the nation's economy, defense, and mobility.

See also

References

External links

 Georgia Roads (Routes 141 - 160)
 Georgia State Route 154 CONN

154
Transportation in Coweta County, Georgia
Transportation in Fulton County, Georgia
Transportation in Douglas County, Georgia
Transportation in DeKalb County, Georgia
Roads in Atlanta